The 1978 Tabas earthquake occurred on September 16 at 19:05:55 local time in central Iran. The shock measured 7.4 on the moment magnitude scale and had a maximum Mercalli intensity of IX+ (Violent). The death toll was in the range of 15,000–25,000, with severe damage occurring in the town of Tabas.

Eighty percent of the human deaths occurred in Tabas, but a total of 85 villages were also affected. Only one significant M5 aftershock occurred.

See also
 List of earthquakes in 1978
 List of earthquakes in Iran

References

External links
 M7.4 - eastern Iran – United States Geological Survey
 

1978 Tabas
Earthquake
History of South Khorasan Province
Tabas Earthquake, 1978